Chryseobacterium nakagawai  is a Gram-negative bacteria from the genus of Chryseobacterium.

References

Further reading

External links
Type strain of Chryseobacterium nakagawai at BacDive -  the Bacterial Diversity Metadatabase

nakagawai
Bacteria described in 2013